Martin Hayes may refer to:

Martin Hayes (bishop) (born 1959), Irish Roman Catholic prelate and current Bishop of Kilmore
Martin Hayes (footballer) (born 1966), English footballer and manager
Martin Hayes (hurler) (1890–1967), Irish hurler
Martin Hayes (musician) (born 1962), Irish fiddler